The Duncan Davies Medal is a medal of Research and Development Society to "an individual who has made an outstanding contribution toward making the UK the best-performing research and development environment in the world.".  It is named after Duncan Davies.

Recipients 

 1990 Robert Malpas – Marketing the Future
 1991 Sir Austin Bide – The influence of science and technology on social progress
 1992 Brian Newbould – The Birth And Growth Of The Pharmaceutical Industry
 1993 Derek Roberts – How To Get The Best Out Of Academic Research
 1994 Sir Robin Nicholson – Industrial R&D In The UK: A New Future?
 1995 David McMurtry – Cost-Effective R&D In A Small High-Tech Environment
 1996 Sir Geoffrey Allen – A Sporting Attitude To R&D
 1997 Sir Richard Sykes – Science In The Business Context: Turning Technology Into Health And Wealth
 1998 Alan Rudge – Research, Relevance, And The Road To Ruin
 1999 Sir Peter Williams – Barriers To Innovation: Myth Or Reality?
 2000 Lord Bragg – Enhancing The Level Of Public Debate On Scientific Matters
 2001 Philip Ruffles – Linking Research & Development To Corporate Strategy And Growth
 2002 Richard Brook – Maecenas And The Multitude: Reflections On Peer Review
 2003 Lord Sainsbury – Exploiting R&D At Regional Level
 2004 Dame Bridget Ogilvie – The Quixotic Nature Of The Involvement Of The Community In The Development Of New  Medical Treatments
 2005 Lord Bhattacharya – The Expanding World Of Technology
 2006 Sir Tom McKillop – The Challenges of Innovation
 2007 Sir Robin Saxby – From start up in a barn in Cambridge to global standard and beyond
 2008 Sir David King – The challenges of the 21st century
 2009 Dame Wendy Hall – Research 2.0: the Age of Networks
 2010 Dame Sue Ion - Fuel for thought – meeting the energy challenges of the 21st Century

References 

British science and technology awards